This article describes the qualifying procedure for the 1960 European Nations' Cup, the inaugural edition of the European Nations' Cup tournament, now known as the UEFA European Championship.

Qualified teams

{| class="wikitable sortable"
|-
! Team
! Qualified as
! Qualified on
|-
|  (host) ||  || 
|-
|  ||  || 
|-
|  ||  || 
|-
|  ||  || 
|}

Format
The qualification was a knockout tournament where the teams would play a two-legged tie on a home-and-away basis. If the aggregate scores were level at the end of the tie, a third leg was played at a neutral venue to decide the winners. It consisted of a preliminary round, a round of 16, and a quarter-final round. The four quarter-final winners would qualify for the tournament proper; one of those four countries would then be chosen to host it.

17 teams entered the competition; notable absences included West Germany, Italy, England and the Netherlands. Two of the entrants, Czechoslovakia and the Republic of Ireland, were selected to play the preliminary round. The winner of that fixture would join the remaining 15 teams in the round of 16.

In fact, a few matches of the round of 16 took place before the preliminary round matches. The first European Nations' Cup qualifying match was played on 28 September 1958 between the Soviet Union and Hungary. The first goal was scored by Anatoli Ilyin of the Soviet Union four minutes into that game. On 3 December 1958, Greece became the first team to be eliminated from the European Nations' Cup after losing 8–2 on aggregate to France.

Preliminary round

Czechoslovakia and the Republic of Ireland were randomly selected to face each other in the preliminary round. The other 15 countries received byes to the round of 16.

Round of 16

Quarter-finals

Goalscorers

Notes

References

External links
 1960 European Nations' Cup at UEFA.com

 
1960 European Nations' Cup
UEFA European Championship qualifying
1958–59 in European football